O-Dog may refer to:

A nickname for baseball player Orlando Hudson
A fictional character in the movie Menace II Society
O-Dog (The Wire) character in the series The Wire
The nickname for former NHL player Jeff O'Neill
The nickname for Owen De Giorgio